Tyrosine-protein phosphatase non-receptor type 14 is an enzyme that in humans is encoded by the PTPN14 gene.

Function 

The protein encoded by this gene is a member of the PTP family and PTPN14 subfamily of tyrosine protein phosphatases. PTPs are known to be signalling molecules that regulate a variety of cellular processes including cell growth, differentiation, mitotic cycle, and oncogenic transformation. This PTP contains an N-terminal noncatalytic domain similar to that of band 4.1 superfamily cytoskeleton-associated proteins, which suggested the membrane or cytoskeleton localization of this protein. The specific function of this PTP has not yet been determined.

Interactions 

PTPN14 has been shown to interact with Beta-catenin.

References

Further reading

External links 
 PDBe-KB provides an overview of all the structure information available in the PDB for Human Tyrosine-protein phosphatase non-receptor type 14 (PTPN14)